The Outer Banks Daredevils are an amateur baseball team playing in the Premier Collegiate League, a collegiate summer baseball league.  The team plays its home games at the Coy Tillett Sr Memorial Field located on the beautiful campus of Manteo High School in Manteo, North Carolina. The Daredevils were one of the original teams in the Coastal Plain League summer baseball league when the league was founded in 1997. The team was originally located in Manteo, North Carolina until the team moved to Kill Devil Hills in 2006, and for the 2023 season, the Daredevils have moved their home field back to Manteo. Since their founding, the Daredevils have had much success winning the 2002 and 2003 Coastal Plain League championships.  After missing the 2012 season, the Daredevils joined the Tidewater Summer League for the 2013 season and went on to win four Tidewater Summer League championships (2013, 2015, 2016, 2018). The Daredevils can be found on the web at outerbanksdaredevils.com

Alumni
 Sam Narron (2000); pitcher, Texas Rangers (2004)
 Justin Maxwell (2002); outfielder, Houston Astros (current)

Awards
 Marshall Hubbard – Offensive Player of the Year

Season-by-season record

References

External links
 Official Site
 Tidewater Summer League

Baseball teams established in 1996
1996 establishments in North Carolina
Amateur baseball teams in North Carolina
Dare County, North Carolina